Vilen Aleksandrovich Kalyuta (22 October 19303 November 1999) was a Ukrainian cinematographer.

He was born on 22 October 1930, in Huliaipole, Zaporizhzhia Oblast, Ukraine. Kalyuta worked on more than 50 movies during his 40-year career.  Notable films by Vilen Kalyuta are White Bird with Black Mark, Flying Asleep and Awake, The Legend of Princess Olga, Urga, Burnt by the Sun and the last film he worked on A Friend of the Deceased. Vilen Kalyuta died on 3 November 1999, in Kyiv, Ukraine.

External links
 

Ukrainian cinematographers
1930 births
1999 deaths
People from Huliaipole
Soviet cinematographers
Recipients of the Shevchenko National Prize